I'm Talking with My Mouth is an EP by indie folk band Hem.  It consists of five cover songs and was sometimes included with pressings of their debut album, Rabbit Songs.

Track listing

References

2002 debut EPs
Hem (band) albums